Zaw Min Tun (born 20 May 1992) is a Burmese professional footballer who plays as a centre back for Malaysia Super League club Penang and the captain of the Myanmar national team. He was the bronze medalist with Myanmar in 2011 SEA Games. 
On 14 December 2012, Tun left Magway to sign a 3-years deal with Yadanarbon for the Burmese record 120 million Kyats ($140,350). He got first runner-up of the MNL 2013 Best Player Award.Considered one of the best defenders in the ASEAN, and has also received praise for his passing and goalscoring capabilities.

Style of play
Zaw Min Tun is a physically strong player who excels in the air due to his elevation and heading accuracy, making him a goal threat on set-pieces.

Due to his leadership, athleticism and technical prowess, his ability to excel both offensively and defensively, as well as his tactical versatility, which allows him to be deployed as a centre back and as a right back.

International

International goals 

Scores and results list Myanmar's goal tally first.

Honours

National Team
Philippine Peace Cup (1): 2014

Club

Yadanarbon
Myanmar National League (1):  2014

Yangon United
Myanmar National League (2):  2015, 2018

References

1992 births
Living people
Sportspeople from Mandalay
Burmese footballers
Myanmar international footballers
Magway FC players
Yadanarbon F.C. players
Yangon United F.C. players
Suphanburi F.C. players
chonburi F.C. players
trat F.C. players
Thai League 1 players
Association football defenders
Southeast Asian Games bronze medalists for Myanmar
Southeast Asian Games medalists in football
Footballers at the 2018 Asian Games
Competitors at the 2011 Southeast Asian Games
Asian Games competitors for Myanmar